The Comeback Trail may refer to:

The Comeback Trail (1982 film), American comedy film
The Comeback Trail (2020 film), remake of the 1982 film